The Premios Gardel a la Música (originally called Premios Carlos Gardel), or just Premios Gardel (in English, the Gardel Awards), is an award presented by the Argentine Chamber of Phonograms and Videograms Producers (CAPIF) to recognize the best of Argentine music and to award the talent of Argentine artists in a diversity of genres and categories. The trophy depicts a sculpture of French Argentine tango singer Carlos Gardel, one of Argentina's music icons. The annual presentation ceremony features performances by prominent artists, and the presentation of awards that have more popular interest.

The honorees are chosen by a jury consisting of musicians, journalists and other members of the media, event producers, sound engineers, and personalities related to music. The awards are the Argentine equivalent to the American Grammy Awards and the British BRIT Awards. The Premios Gardel have been described as the "most important prize in the country's music business".

History 
After the ACE Awards (1992–1997) failed to become Argentina's standard music awards due to lack due to lack of support from the industry, the Gardel Awards appeared to take over that spot.

The awards are named after Carlos Gardel, one of Argentina's earliest and most well-known popular music performers. 
The awards were organized by CAPIF with the first ceremony held in 1999 for music released between June 1, 1997, and November 30, 1998. The jury for the first awards comprised 500 members.

In 2003, the voting committee was made "truly independent from the record companies, whose staffs can no longer vote," according to then-CAPIF executive director, Gabriel Salcedo. The jury increased to 1,500 members, including artists, producers, and journalists of "every musical genre". In the past, the Gardels were viewed as a "pat on the back" from the industry to its favorite, best-selling artists, but the revamped voting was viewed as giving transparency to the selection process and a new-found credibility to the awards themselves.

Ceremonies

Footnotes:

Categories
The Gardel Awards are awarded in a series of categories, each of which isolate a specific contribution to the recording industry. The standard awards list nominees in each category from which a winner is selected. Twenty-four Gardel Awards were awarded in the first award ceremony, but the number of awards has grown and fluctuated over time as new categories are added and some older ones removed. As of 2022, the number of categories is forty-eight.

General Field
The General Field are standard awards for musical works which do not restrict nominees by genre or some other criterion:
 Album of the Year is awarded to the performer(s) of a full vocal or instrumental album. The winner of this category receives the Gardel de Oro Award, a golden version of the trophy and the Awards' greatest distinction.
 Song of the Year is awarded to the performer(s), songwriter(s) and composer(s) of the song.
 Record of the Year is awarded to the performer(s), producer(s) and recording engineer(s) of a full album. Formerly known as Production of the Year, it also allows songs to be nominated since 2020.
 Best New Artist is awarded to the performer of a full album or song who has not released more than two albums or twenty songs. From 2007 to 2018 (except in 2010), the category was replaced genre-specific versions for pop, rock, tango, folklore, tropical and cuarteto.
 Collaboration of the Year is awarded to the performers, songwriter(s) and composer(s) of the song. It is awarded since 2020.

Winners

Footnotes:

Genre-specific categories
As of the 2022 ceremony, there are 48 categories, including the General Field.

No longer awarded

Voting process
The voting process begins every year with media companies entering albums, songs and music videos for consideration. Entries are made online. Once the postulation date expires and all entries have been registered in the differed categories, CAPIF summons the Revision Committees, work groups consisting of journalists, producers, musicians and specialist that revise the entries to revise that the entries have been registered in the right category according to its music genre and particular characteristics. Once it has been revised, the selection of nominees begins.

For selecting the nominees, CAPIF informs the jury of the Gardel Awards that the first stage of the voting process is open for each category. Members of the jury can access online to the audio and video contents that habe been submitted for nomination and choose those that consider should be nominated. Once this stage of the voting process finishes, CAPIF publishes the official list of nominees.

After the list of nominees has been defined, the voting members must select one winner for each category. This is also made online. Lastly, CAPIF informs the winners in the pre-telecast ceremony and the official awards show ceremony.

See also
19th Annual Gardel Awards
21st Annual Gardel Awards
23rd Annual Gardel Awards

References

Argentine music awards
Awards established in 1999
1999 establishments in Argentina